The National Indigenous Music Awards 2019 are the 16th annual National Indigenous Music Awards.

The nominations were announced on 18 July 2019 and the awards ceremony was held on 12 August 2019. NIMA Reference Group Chair, Warren H. Williams said "In the past year, Indigenous music has continued its meteoric rise to the top of music in Australia, pushing boundaries and finding its place at the forefront of art in our country. The NIMAs follows that rise ready to recognise and amplify the voices of our musicians on their journey upwards."

Judging of the National Indigenous Music Awards is split for the first time, with 50% of votes coming from a panel of prominent Indigenous Australians and community leaders and 50% from a panel of Indigenous and non-Indigenous media and music industry representatives.

Performers
Archie Roach
Jessica Mauboy
Dan Sultan
Electric Fields 
Tasman Keith
Spinifex Gum
Deborah Cheetham
Kenbi Dancers 
Eric Avery

Hall of Fame inductee
 Tiddas and Wilma Reading

Tiddas formed in 1990 by Lou Bennett, Sally Dastey and Amy Saunders and signed to PolyGram Records. They released their first EP Inside My Kitchen in 1992, and were nominated for two ARIA Award nominations at the ARIA Music Awards of 1993. Their 1993 debut album, Sing About Life was certified gold and won the ARIA Award for Best Indigenous Release at the ARIA Music Awards of 1994. Their self-titled album was released in 1996 and a third album was released in 1997, before calling it a day in 2000.

Wilma Reading began her career in 1959 singing for friends at the Brisbane Jazz Club before heading to the USA where she released singles, performed on The Tonight Show Starring Johnny Carson, toured with Duke Ellington held down a residency in New Yorks famed Copacabana nightclub and played the London Palladium. She performed across the world with orchestras, in movies (alongside Jim Brown in Pacific Inferno) and on TV across five continents.

Triple J Unearthed National Indigenous Winner
 Dallas Woods

Dallas Woods Grew up in the town of Wyndham in the East Kimberleys and is a proud Noongar man. At 25 years old, Woods pens passionate and searing takedowns of the system around him, taking aim at the structures that unjustly work against the remote Indigenous Communities throughout the country. In 2018, Woods uploaded his first track "9x Out of 10" to his Unearthed profile and has toured nationally with Baker Boy, appearing on his single "Black Magic" and shares songwriting credits on "Mr La Di Da Di".

Special Recognition award
 Djuki Mala

Archie Roach Foundation Award
The inaugural Archie Roach Foundation Award for an emerging NT artist was awarded to Mambali.

Awards
Artist of the Year

New Talent of the Year

Album of the Year

Film Clip of the Year

Song of the Year

Community Clip of the Year

References

2019 in Australian music
2019 music awards
National Indigenous Music Awards